Connemara Airport or Connemara Regional Airport (Aerfort Réigiúnach Chonamara)  is located at Inverin in the Connemara region of Ireland,  west of the city of Galway. It is also known as Spiddal Airport, Inverin Airport, or Minna Airport (Aerfort na Minne), a name also used by Minna Airport in Minna, Nigeria.

The airport was constructed in 1992, partly funded by Údarás na Gaeltachta (the development agency for the Gaeltacht) to help ensure the viability of the Aran Islands communities.

Aer Arann Islands operates Britten-Norman Islander aircraft to the Aran Islands of Inisheer, Inishmaan and Inishmore off the coast of County Galway in Ireland.

Airlines and destinations

Statistics

Accidents and incidents
On 5 July 2007 a Cessna 208 crashed on approach to the airport due to rough weather conditions, killing two and injuring seven. The plane was a charter plane, and was returning from a day trip to Inis Meáin.

References

External links

Aviation photos for Connemara (EICA) at Airliners.net

Airports in the Republic of Ireland
Transport in County Galway